I Learned That in Paris (German: Das hab ich in Paris gelernt) is a 1960 West German musical comedy film directed by Thomas Engel and starring Chris Howland, Christa Williams and Gisela Trowe.

Cast
 Chris Howland as Fred Miller 
 Christa Williams as Dr. Brigitte Freyer 
 Gisela Trowe as Clarissa Wedell 
 Dieter Borsche as Bernhard Wedell, ihr Mann 
 Harald Juhnke as Mathias Mai, Lawyer
 Carl-Heinz Schroth as Faktotum Neumann 
 Werner Fuetterer as Hubert Wüstenhagen 
 Hans Nielsen as Professor Giselius 
 Erwin Linder as Dr. Knapp 
 Lotte Rausch as Hilde 
 Maria Sebaldt as Lydia 
 Birgit Bergen as Betty
 Edith Hancke
 Kurt Klopsch
 Karl Kramer
 Karl-Heinz Kreienbaum 
 Maria Litto
 Hein Timm

References

Bibliography
 Bock, Hans-Michael & Bergfelder, Tim. The Concise CineGraph. Encyclopedia of German Cinema. Berghahn Books, 2009.

External links 
 

1960 films
1960 musical comedy films
German musical comedy films
West German films
1960s German-language films
Films directed by Thomas Engel
1960s German films